1462 Zamenhof, provisional designation , is a carbonaceous Themistian asteroid from the outer regions of the asteroid belt, approximately 27 kilometers in diameter. It was discovered on 6 February 1938, by Finnish astronomer Yrjö Väisälä at the Iso-Heikkilä Observatory in Finland. The asteroid was named after L. L. Zamenhof, the creator of Esperanto. It is a recognized Zamenhof-Esperanto object.

Orbit and classification 

Zamenhof is a Themistian asteroid that belongs to the Themis family, a very large family of carbonaceous asteroids, named after 24 Themis. It orbits the Sun in the outer main-belt at a distance of 2.8–3.5 AU once every 5 years and 7 months (2,042 days). Its orbit has an eccentricity of 0.11 and an inclination of 1° with respect to the ecliptic. The body's observation arc begins at the discovering observatory, one month prior to its official discovery observation.

Physical characteristics 

The Lightcurve Data Base assumes Zamenhof to be a common, carbonaceous C-type asteroid, in agreement with the overall spectral type of the Themis family.

Rotation period 

Two rotational lightcurves of Zamenhof were obtained from photometric observations in 2006 and 2011. Lightcurve analysis gave a rotation period of 10.2 and 10.4 hours with a brightness amplitude of 0.15 and 0.30 magnitude, respectively.

Diameter and albedo 

According to the surveys carried out by the Japanese Akari satellite and the NEOWISE mission of NASA's Wide-field Infrared Survey Explorer, Zamenhof measures between 25.91 and 27.645 kilometers in diameter and its surface has an albedo between 0.087 and 0.121.

The Collaborative Asteroid Lightcurve Link derives an albedo of 0.0891 and a diameter of 25.62 kilometers based on an absolute magnitude of 11.2.

Naming 

This minor planet was named after L. L. Zamenhof (1859–1917), a Polish-Jewish ophthalmologist and creator of Esperanto, a constructed international language. This asteroid and 1421 Esperanto are considered to be the most remote Zamenhof-Esperanto objects (a monument or a place celebrating Zamenhof). The official  was published by the Minor Planet Center in January 1956.

References

External links 
 Asteroid Lightcurve Database (LCDB), query form (info )
 Dictionary of Minor Planet Names, Google books
 Asteroids and comets rotation curves, CdR – Observatoire de Genève, Raoul Behrend
 Discovery Circumstances: Numbered Minor Planets (1)-(5000) – Minor Planet Center
 
 

001462
Discoveries by Yrjö Väisälä
Named minor planets
19380206